Alexander Phoebus Dionysiou Mourelatos (born 1936) is an American philosopher. He is a recipient of Guggenheim Fellowship.

Works 

 The Route of Parmenides. Yale UP, 1974.
 (Hrsg.): The Pre-Socratics: A Collection of Critical Essays. Doubleday 1974, ND Princeton University Press 1993.

References

Further reading 

 Victor Caston, Daniel W. Graham (Hrsg.), Presocratic Philosophy: Essays in Honour of Alexander Mourelatos. Ashgate, 2002; ND Routledge, London and New York 2016 – Enthält in der Einleitung Biographie, Ss. vii–ix, und Schriftenverzeichnis Ss. xi–xv, (Auszüge online)

1936 births
American philosophers
University of Texas at Austin faculty
Historians of philosophy
Living people